Julius Wilson (born October 17, 1983) is an American football offensive tackle who is currently a free agent. He was signed by the Miami Dolphins as an undrafted free agent in 2007. He played college football at UAB.

Wilson has also been a member of the St. Louis Rams, Tampa Bay Buccaneers, Florida Tuskers and Omaha Nighthawks.

On December 14, 2010, Wilson worked out for the Baltimore Ravens, but was not signed.

External links
UAB Blazers bio
Ravens continue to evaluate roster

1983 births
Living people
Sportspeople from Bradenton, Florida
Players of American football from Florida
American football offensive tackles
American football offensive guards
UAB Blazers football players
Miami Dolphins players
St. Louis Rams players
Tampa Bay Buccaneers players
Florida Tuskers players
Orlando Predators players
Omaha Nighthawks players
Tampa Bay Storm players
Los Angeles Kiss players